The Lighthouse is the second studio album (third overall) by the British-American synthpop duo Red Flag. It was released in 1994 on their own label, Plan B Records.

Track listing
 "Inner Sea" (4:41)
 "Ambient Tier" (5:00)
 "Shame on the Moon" (3:08)
 "Cry Me a River" (3:43)
 "My Love" (3:56)
 "In My Dreams" (3:11)
 "Ruby Roses" (7:33)
 "Things We Say" (12:45)
 "The Lighthouse" (3:10)
 "Inner Sea Revisited" (5:31)
 "Cry Me a River Revisited" (5:50)

Reviews
  "The Lighthouse" (Orbit Jan/Feb 1995)

1994 albums
Red Flag (band) albums